Allen P. Berkstresser (September 25, 1885 – December 17, 1956) was an American football and basketball coach and college athletic administrator. He served as the head football coach at Parsons College in Fairfield, Iowa from 1910 to 1912 and at Iowa State Teachers College—now known at the University of Northern Iowa—in Cedar Falls, Iowa from 1913 to 1916, compiling a career college football coaching record of 17–23–7. Berkstresser was also the head basketball coach at Iowa State Teachers from 1913 to 1917.

Berkstresser was a 1910 graduate of Morningside College in Sioux City, Iowa.

Head coaching record

References

External links
 

1885 births
1956 deaths
Northern Iowa Panthers athletic directors
Northern Iowa Panthers football coaches
Northern Iowa Panthers men's basketball coaches
Parsons Wildcats football coaches
Morningside University alumni
People from Mount Carroll, Illinois
Basketball coaches from Illinois